Hazel Paulina Quirós Acuña (born 7 July 1992) is a Costa Rican footballer who plays as a defender. She has been a member of the Costa Rica women's national team.

Club career
Quirós has played for UCEM Alajuela and Sporting San José in Costa Rica.

International career
Quirós capped for Costa Rica at senior debut during the 2010 CONCACAF Women's World Cup Qualifying, the 2012 CONCACAF Women's Olympic Qualifying Tournament qualification and the 2011 Pan American Games.

References

External links

1992 births
Living people
Costa Rican women's footballers
Women's association football defenders
Costa Rica women's international footballers
Pan American Games competitors for Costa Rica
Footballers at the 2011 Pan American Games
LGBT association football players
Costa Rican LGBT people